The Champs are an American rock band, most famous for their Latin-tinged rock and roll instrumental "Tequila". The group took their name from that of Gene Autry's horse, Champion, and was formed by studio executives at Autry's Challenge Records to record a B-side for the Dave Burgess single, "Train to Nowhere". The intended throwaway track became more famous than its A-side, as "Tequila" went to No. 1 in just three weeks, and the band became the first group to go to the top spot with an instrumental that was their first release. The song was recorded at Gold Star Studios in fall 1957, and in 1959 won the Grammy Award for Best R&B Performance. It sold over one million copies, and was awarded a gold disc by the RIAA.

History

Success with their 1958 song "Tequila" 
"Tequila" was written by the saxophonist Danny Flores, although he was credited as Chuck Rio because he was under contract to another record label (RPM Records) at the time. Flores, who died in September 2006, was known as the "Godfather of Latino rock". Flores' "dirty sax" and his low-voiced "Tequila" are the hallmarks of the song. Flores signed away the US rights to the song but retained worldwide rights until his death. 

There are many cover versions of the tune, including a jazz version by guitarist Wes Montgomery in 1966. It has also been recorded by rappers A.L.T. and XL Singleton. The Champs also had success with instrumentals such as "Limbo Rock" and "El Rancho Rock". In 1985, "Tequila" featured prominently in the film Pee Wee's Big Adventure. The Champs also recorded a sequel to "Tequila" entitled "Too Much Tequila".

2020 band reunion 
In 2020, group leader Burgess resurrected The Champs for a new album, Tequila Party, scheduled for November release. The LP contains 12 newly recorded tracks including a "party" rendition of their signature hit plus seven new compositions.

Band members
Chuck Rio – saxophone, vocals (born Daniel Flores on July 11, 1929, Santa Paula, California, died September 19, 2006, Huntington Beach, California)
Dave Burgess – rhythm guitar (a.k.a. "Dave Dupree", born December 13, 1934, Beverly Hills, California)
Dale Norris – lead guitar (born Springfield, Missouri)
Buddy Bruce – lead guitar (born 1930, Missouri , died 2014, Tulsa, Oklahoma)
Bob Morris – bass guitar (born Hasty, Arkansas)
Benjamin Van Norman – bass (born July 19, 1928, Ann Arbor, Michigan, died November 3, 1958 Buena Park, California in a car accident)
Cliff Hills – bass (born 1918, Philadelphia, Pennsylvania)
Joe Burnas  – bass (born 1923, Chicago, died April 12, 1999) 
Gene Alden – drums (born 1930, South Dakota)
Dean Beard – piano (born August 31, 1935, Santa Anna, Texas, died April 4, 1989, in Coleman, Texas) 
Seals and Crofts
Dave "Snuffy" Smith played bass from late 1959 to 1960. Other members around this time were Jimmy Seals, Dash Crofts, with Johnny Meeks (originally of Gene Vincent and the Blue Caps) on lead guitar.
Later band members included Glen Campbell, Jerry Cole, Chuck Downs (drums), Rich Grissom, Gary Nieland (drums), Jerry Puckett (guitar), Marvin Siders, and Leon Sanders. The last lineup of the band, in 1964, included Johnny Trombatore, who co-wrote some songs with Jim Seals, Dash Crofts, Maurice Marshall, bassist Curtis Paul and Seals' replacement, Keith MacKendrick (who later stayed on saxophone when Seals returned.)

Singles

See also
Chicano rock

References

External links

 
 "The Champs" on the History of Rock website
Website:  http://www.TheChampsOfficial.com
 

Challenge Records artists
Apex Records artists
Musical groups from Ventura County, California
Grammy Award winners
Chicano rock musicians
Surf music groups
American instrumental musical groups
Challenge Records (1950s) artists